Clara Mulholland (1849–1934) was a writer who was born in Belfast but moved to England at an early age. In addition to being a prolific novelist since the 1880s, she wrote children's literature, plays, and was a translator from French into English.

Early life and education
Clara Mulholland was born in Belfast in 1849. Her father was Joseph Stevenson Mulholland, a medical doctor. Her siblings included older sisters Rosa, Lady Gilbert (wife of Sir John Thomas Gilbert) and Ellen, Lady Russell (wife of Charles Russell, Baron Russell of Killowen, Lord Chief Justice of England), as well as a brother, William Mulholland. 

The siblings belonged to a County Antrim family which had many representatives in the U.S. bearing the names of Mulholland, Mullholland, Milholland, and Millholland. Members of the most prominent branch of the family were for a century leading cotton spinners of Belfast, the eldest line of which was elevated to the British peerage as Barons of Dunleath.

Clara left Belfast at a very early age. She was educated in Loughborough, Leicestershire, England, at a convent of the Sisters of Providence of the Institute of Charity, and afterwards at a convent of the Dames de Marie, Coloma, Belgium.

Career

Her first story for young children, was published by Messrs. Marcus, Ward & Co., of Belfast, and by John Murphy, of Baltimore. Then followed - Naughty Miss Bunny, The Strange Adventures of Little Snowdrop, and Little Merry Face and His Crown of Content. Later, Mulholland wrote stories for various London magazines and papers, and for Messrs. Tillotson & Sons, of Bolton, and the National Press Agency, London. Her other books were, A Striking Contrast, Kathleen Mavourneen and Linda's Misfortunes and Little Brian's trip to Dublin.

Her translation of The Little Hunchback, by the Comtesse de Segur, was published in London, 1876, with a new edition in 1883. The translation for Mystical Flora of St. Francis de Sales was published in London, 1880. Another translation included The Power of St. Joseph - A Book of Meditations and Devotions in honour of the Foster-Father of Our Lord, by the Rev. Father Huguet, S.M.; translated from the French by Clara Mulholland (Dublin : McGlashan and Gill, 1876).

Bound Together - Six Short Plays for Home and School (Baltimore : John Murphy & Co., 1897) was co-authored by Clara and Rosa.

Other works followed including, The Little Bogtrotters; or, A Few Weeks at Conmore (London, 1878), Little Brian's Trip to Dublin (London, 1885), The Miser of King's Court (London, 1887), Percy's Revenge (Dublin, 1887), In A Roundabout Way (1908), and Sweet Doreen (1915).

Death
Clara Mulholland died at her home in South Terrace, Littlehampton, Sussex, in 1934.

Selected works

Books

 Mystical flora of St. Francis de Sales : or, the Christian life under the emblem of plants , 1877
 The Little Bogtrotters; or, A Few Weeks at Conmore, 1878
 Naughty Miss Bunny : a story for little children, 1882
 Linda's Misfortunes and Little Brian's trip to Dublin, 1885
 The Miser of King's Court, 1887
 Percy's Revenge - a story for boys, 1887
 The Strange Adventures of Little Snowdrop, 1889
 Kathleen Mavourneen, 1890
 Little Merry Face and his crown of content : and other tales, 1891
 Ella's sacrifice, 1891
 Little Larry, 1891
 The O'Briens' Christmas, 1892
 A Striking Contrast, 1895
 Bunt and Bill, 1902
 The Senior lieutenant's wager - and other stories, 1905
 The lost chord, 1905
 In A Roundabout Way, 1908
 Through mist and shadow, 1909
 Sweet Doreen, 1915 
 Skenet bedrager : Roman, 1920
 Her last message, 1926
 Little Merry Face and His Crown of Content
 The little house under the hill
 Sheila's Presentiment

Plays
 Miss Carnduff's Next-of-Kin a Comedietta in Two Acts. Act II, 1884
 Bound Together - Six Short Plays for Home and School (Baltimore : John Murphy & Co., 1897); co-authored by Clara and Rosa Mulholland.

Articles
 "Dave's Repentance"
 "Terence O'Neill's heiress", 1907
 "Mistress Mary", 1912

Translations
 The Little Hunchback, by the Comtesse de Segur, 1876
 The Power of St. Joseph - A Book of Meditations and Devotions in honour of the Foster-Father of Our Lord. (By the Rev. Father Huguet, S.M. Translated from the French by Clara Mulholland. Dublin : McGlashan and Gill, 1876)
  For little children. Advice on Piety. (By Louis-Gaston de Ségur. Translated by Clara Mulholland. 1895)

Notes

References

1849 births
1934 deaths
Writers from Belfast
Novelists from Northern Ireland
Children's writers from Northern Ireland
Translators from Northern Ireland
19th-century Irish women writers
20th-century Irish women writers
French–English translators
Women children's writers
19th-century Irish dramatists and playwrights